Tom & Jerry is a steel, sit-down roller coaster at Parque Warner Madrid near Madrid, Spain. The coaster is named and themed after the cartoon Tom and Jerry.

History
The roller coaster (then under the name Boardwalk Canyon Blaster) was on the 2000 park map at Six Flags Fiesta Texas. However, it was never built at Fiesta Texas, as the park exceeded its yearly budget. The coaster would sit in storage in the employee parking lot behind Poltergeist for the rest of the 2000 season.

In 2001, the ride was relocated to then under construction Parque Warner Madrid (then known as Warner Bros. Movie World Madrid), where it was assembled and opened as Tom & Jerry when the park opened on 6 April 2002.

References

Roller coasters in Spain
2002 establishments in Spain